East Riding Community Hospital is a health facility in Swinemoor Lane, Beverley, East Riding of Yorkshire, England. It is managed by Humber Teaching NHS Foundation Trust.

History
The hospital was commissioned to replace the aging Westwood Hospital. It was built by Interserve at a cost of £19 million and opened in July 2012. In early 2015 the number of beds provided was increased from 26 to 36 to meet a surge in demand.

References

Hospitals established in 2012
2012 establishments in England
Hospital buildings completed in 2012
Hospitals in the East Riding of Yorkshire
NHS hospitals in England
Beverley